Tsuen Wan Town Hall is a town hall in Tsuen Wan, New Territories, Hong Kong. Originally it was intended to be located near Tsuen Wan station of the MTR, but it was re-located near the former Tsuen Wan Ferry Pier and Tsuen Wan Magistracy, between Tai Ho Road and Yuen Tun Circuit in late 1970s. The town hall was completed in 1980.

History
The complex was built as part of the Tsuen Wan New Town project. It was officially opened by Princess Alexandra on 7 February 1980. Day-to-day operations were originally the responsibility of the Urban Services Department.

Facilities
Its facilitates include: auditorium, cultural activities hall, exhibition gallery, conference room and lecture room.

The auditorium is the core of the town hall. With excellent acoustics design, it is often chosen by Hong Kong Philharmonic Orchestra for practising.

Future
The government is considering consolidating several low-rise government buildings in Tsuen Wan, including the Tsuen Wan Town Hall, into a single high-rise. Local musicians have decried this news, as they consider the venue to be Hong Kong's best music hall from an acoustics standpoint, and do not want to see it demolished.

See also
 Kwai Tsing Theatre – a similar venue in Kwai Chung, an adjacent district

References

External links

 

1980 establishments in Hong Kong
Concert halls in Hong Kong
Music venues completed in 1980
Music venues in Hong Kong
Theatres in Hong Kong
Tsuen Wan
Tsuen Wan District